is a passenger railway station located in the city of Kōnan, Kōchi Prefecture, Japan. It is operated by the third-sector Tosa Kuroshio Railway with the station number "GN37".

Lines
All Asa Line trains, rapid and local, stop at the station.

Layout
The station consists of two opposed side platforms serving two elevated tracks. Track/platform 1 is used for eastbound trains and track/platform 2 is for the westbound ones. The station building is built into the elevated structure underneath the tracks and houses a waiting area and a shop. The shop is operated by the Koan City Tourism Association which also staffs the ticket window as a kan'i itaku agent. Access to the platforms is by a flight of steps or elevators.

Adjacent stations

Station mascot
Each station on the Asa Line features a cartoon mascot character designed by Takashi Yanase, a local cartoonist from Kōchi Prefecture. The mascot for Noichi Station is a clown named . A statue of this mascot is located near the station entrance. The character relates to a chindon'ya (Japanese costumed marching band) competition which is held in Noichi annually.

History

Passenger statistics
In fiscal 2011, the station was used by an average of 1,265 passengers daily.

Surrounding area
Konan City Hall (formerly Noichi Town Hall)
Konan City Noichi Elementary School
Shikoku Automobile Museum
Japan National Route 55

See also 
List of railway stations in Japan

References

External links

Railway stations in Kōchi Prefecture
Railway stations in Japan opened in 2002
Kōnan, Kōchi